Morning Glory School & College (also referred as "MGSC") is a Co-educational school and college which is situated in Savar Cantonment, Savar, Dhaka District, Bangladesh. It is run by the 71 Mechanized Brigade of Bangladesh Army. The school has classes from Play Group to College. MGSC refers M for Marigold, G for Gladiolus, S for Silvia and C for Cosmos.

References

Organisations based in Savar
Schools in Dhaka District
Universities and colleges in Savar
Education in Savar
Educational Institutions affiliated with Bangladesh Army